The Ministry of Environment of Moldova is one of the fourteen ministries of the Government of Moldova.

Ministers of Environment

References

Agriculture, Regional Development and Environment
Moldova
Moldova
Agriculture in Moldova